Ashley Carter (born 12 September 1995) is an English footballer who plays for  side Stourbridge, where he plays as a defender.

Playing career

Wolverhampton Wanderers
Carter signed his first professional contract with Wolverhampton Wanderers on 12 February 2014.

Chesterfield (loan)
Carter joined League One side Chesterfield on a month-long youth loan on 2 February 2015. Carter made his debut for Chesterfield on 17 February 2015 in a 0–2 defeat away to Scunthorpe United. His loan was subsequently extended to run until the end of the season, but despite this the player never played again for Chesterfield during the period.

Tamworth (loan)
On 4 March 2016, Carter joined Tamworth on loan for the remainder of the season. Carter made his Tamworth debut the following day in a home fixture against Stockport County, and gave a good account of himself in a new look back three formation, the match finished in a 1–1 draw.

Kidderminster Harriers
On 29 June 2016, Carter signed a one-year deal with Conference North side Kidderminster Harriers.

Alvechurch
Following on from his release by Kidderminster Harriers, Carter joined Northern Premier League Division One South side Alvechurch on 12 May 2017 on a two-year contract.

Nuneaton Borough
Carter joined Conference North side Nuneaton Borough from Alvechurch on 28 June 2018. Carter still had a year to run on his contract with Alvechurch, but both clubs eventually agreed a deal for an undisclosed fee.

Alvechurch
On 14 November 2018, Carter re-joined Alvechurch.  He made his second debut for the club on 17 November 2018, in a Southern League Premier Central fixture against St Neots Town, which Alvechurch won 3–2.

Stourbridge
Carter joined Stourbridge on 30 May 2019.

References

External links

1995 births
Living people
English footballers
Association football defenders
Wolverhampton Wanderers F.C. players
Chesterfield F.C. players
Tamworth F.C. players
Kidderminster Harriers F.C. players
Alvechurch F.C. players
Nuneaton Borough F.C. players
Stourbridge F.C. players
English Football League players
People from Rotherham
Footballers from Rotherham